The Quéménéven Parish close comprising the parish church, a triumphal arch and calvary is located in the arrondissement of Châteaulin in Finistère  in Brittany. The bell tower and the western façade of the church are a listed historical monument since 1969.

The Église Saint-Ouen
This, the Quéménéven parish church and originally dating back to 1786, was reconstructed between 1860 and 1861. The church has a nave of three bays with aisles, a transept and choir.

The stained glass window known as the "Crucifixion" window
A 16th-century stained glass window depicts the "Passion of Jesus Christ".

The porch
In a niche above the porch entrance is a statue of Saint Ouen.

Statuary
The church has statues of Saint Méen in the attire of a bishop, Saint Peter, Saint Guénolé (a polychromed woodcarving dating to the 16th century), Saint Enéour, Saint Ouen and Saint Lawrence. Méen was a Breton saint, thought to be Cornish or Welsh in origin.

The calvary

The Calvary attached to the parish church is 6 metres in height and statues of John the Evangelist and the Virgin Mary are back to back with the people in the Pietà. At the summit of the Calvary a depiction of the crucifixion includes an angel touching Jesus' hair.

See also

References

Churches in Finistère
Calvaries in Brittany
Parish closes in Brittany